Mr Gay World 2013, the 5th Mr Gay World competition, was held over 5 days in Antwerp, Belgium during the worldOutgames 2013, with the Grand Finale at Elckerlijc Theatre, Antwerp, Belgium on August 4, 2013. Andreas Derleth of New Zealand crowned his successor Christopher Michael Olwage, also of New Zealand, at the end of this event. 25 countries and territories competed for the title.

Results

Special awards

Judges
Eric Butter - President of Mr Gay World (Australia);
Andy Derleth - Mr Gay World 2012 (New Zealand);
Adebisi Alimi - Public speaker and a Sessional University Lecturer (Nigeria);
Beverly Vergel - Training Specialist, Image Consultant (Philippines);
Kristof De Busser - Chief Inspector and Member of the Diversity Team of the Antwerp Local Police (Belgium);
Michiel Vanackere - Field coordinator for a European HIV prevalence research project at the Institute for Tropical Health in Antwerp (Belgium);
Morris Chapdelaine - Film producer and media specialist (Canada).

Contestants

National pageant notes

Debuts

Returning countries
Last competed in 2009:

Last competed in 2010:

Last competed in 2011:

References 

2013
2013 beauty pageants
Beauty pageants in Belgium
2013 in Belgium
2013 in LGBT history
August 2013 events in Europe
2010s in Antwerp